Mahatma Gandhi Setu (also called Gandhi Setu or Ganga Setu) is a bridge over the river Ganges in Bihar, India, connecting Patna in the south to Hajipur in the north. It was inaugurated in May 1982 in a ceremony in Hajipur by the then prime minister, Indira Gandhi. From 1982 to 2017, Mahatma Gandhi Setu remained as the longest bridge in India. Later, Gandhi Setu rehabilitation project was undertaken to install triangular steel trusses on Mahatma Gandhi Setu.

Planning and significance 

The bridge was approved by the Central Government in 1969 and built by Gammon India Limited over a period of ten years, from 1972 to 1982. The total expenditure was  crore (872.2 million rupees). It was built to connect North Bihar with the rest of Bihar through the state's capital at Patna, and as part of national highway 19 (NH19). Since then, the Vikramshila Setu has also been built across the Ganges. Two more rail-cum-road bridges  are completely constructed, between Digha and Sonepur and at Munger. More bridges named Kacchi Dargah Biddupur under Greenfield expressway, at Chhapra,Bakhtiyaarpur, Sultanganj are under construction.

The Indian postal department issued a commemorative postage stamp, "Landmark Bridges Of India: Mahatma Gandhi Setu", on 17 August 2007.

Engineering 
The deck provides for a  two-lane roadway for IRC class 70 R loading with footpaths on either side. The cantilever segmental construction method was adopted; each span has two cantilever beams on both sides which are free to move at the ends. These lanes are free from each other with no connections. It was constructed using  pre-cast parts, which were joined at both ends to complete the span. The spans are connected with a protrusion which is free to move longitudinally. Vertical movement allows for vibrations from vehicular movement to transfer smoothly between spans without much discreteness.

Traffic congestion
In recent decades, the bridge has experienced major traffic chaos due to the increasing number of vehicles crossing it, operating in excess of capacity and overloading the structure. The Bihar government has planned to build two pontoon bridges parallel to it, in order to relieve these problems. The bridge is crossed daily by over 85,000 vehicles and 12,000 pedestrians.
On 21 September 2020 Prime Minister Mr Narendra Modi laid the foundation stone of another 4 lane road bridge measuring 14.5 km and will cost 2926.42 crores  It will be on the west side of present bridge and in future, it will become 8 lane bridge including the present 4 lane bridge.

History 

 Construction started: Year 1972
 Scheduled opening: June 1978.
 Tender cost: 23.50 crore
 1st Extension of Time (EOT): June 1980
 Allocated cost: 46.67 crore
 Reasons for cost increase: This extra cost is the outcome of an "in-built" cost escalation clause in the contract
 Reasons for delay: Heavy storm in April 1979 destroyed two gantries and casting beds. Each gantry crane weighs 300 tonnes. Huge shortage of cement and building material and a workers' strike
 Reports: Cement and other building materials stored for this project find their way into Nepal and parts of Bihar 
from the northern side of the bridge. 
 2nd Extension of Time (EOT): December 1981
 Project progress: 80% ( physical ) up to September 1980
 Billed value: 41 crore
 Contractor's extra claim : 50 crore
Litigation & arbitration: 
Disagreement between the contractors and the Government overpayments stalled construction activity. 
Claims and bills got referred to the Law Department.
Final completion date: June 1982 ( Eastern carriageway )
Completion date: April 1987 ( Western carriageway )
Total cost: 87 crores
Minister of State for Public Works: Raghunath Jha
Chief Minister: Jagannath Mishra

Structural integrity and failure

The bridge has often been subjected to structural loads and moving loads exceeding its design. Major repairs were initiated on it within five years of its completion. Poor maintenance, coupled with wear and tear caused by the unprecedented surge in traffic, has made the structure vulnerable. Other bridges in India which were built with the same cantilever design have developed cracks.

Investigations into the fissures developed in the bridge revealed the following defects: hammering at the hinges when vehicles plied; finger-type expansion joints in an advanced state of distress; wearing coat cracks; spilling of concrete at transverse joints; longitudinal cracks in precast segments; leakage of water inside the box girder from joints between segments and from holes provided for lifting the segments.

Gandhi Setu rehabilitation project
Mahatma Gandhi Setu is now being revamped. Gandhi Setu rehabilitation project is being executed by Afcons Infrastructure in joint venture with Sibmost OJSC at an estimated cost of 1,742.01 crore.  Of that, Rs 237 crore is spent on dismantling the structure that was replaced by the steel framework. The superstructure of Gandhi Setu was renewed by Steel Truss Girders, i.e. the steel framework replaced the entire concrete superstructure. While the superstructure was damaged, the pillars were not and nor was the foundation weakened. The triangular steel trusses were installed on each flank of Gandhi setu. The renovated Western flank was opened to public on 31 July 2020, and the completed bridge (including both the flanks) was inaugurated in June 2022.

See also 
List of longest bridges in the world
List of longest bridges above water in India
List of bridges in India
Kacchi Dargah-Bidupur Bridge

References 

Road bridges in India
Bridges completed in 1982
Transport in Patna
Tourist attractions in Patna district
Buildings and structures in Patna
Bridges over the Ganges
Bridges in Bihar
Former toll bridges
1982 establishments in Bihar
20th-century architecture in India